Turning is a machining process in which a cutting tool, typically a non-rotary tool bit, describes a helix toolpath by moving more or less linearly while the workpiece rotates.

Usually the term "turning" is reserved for the generation of  external surfaces by this cutting action, whereas this same essential cutting action when applied to internal surfaces (holes, of one kind or another) is called "boring". Thus the phrase "turning and boring" categorizes the larger family of processes known as lathing. The cutting of faces on the workpiece, whether with a turning or boring tool, is called "facing", and may be lumped into either category as a subset.

Turning can be done manually, in a traditional form of lathe, which frequently requires continuous supervision by the operator, or by using an automated lathe which does not. Today the most common type of such automation is computer numerical control, better known as CNC. (CNC is also commonly used with many other types of machining besides turning.)

When turning, the workpiece (a piece of relatively rigid material such as wood, metal, plastic, or stone) is rotated and a cutting tool is traversed along 1, 2, or 3 axes of motion to produce precise diameters and depths. Turning can be either on the outside of the cylinder or on the inside (also known as boring) to produce tubular components to various geometries. Although now quite rare, early lathes could even be used to produce complex geometric figures, even the platonic solids; although since the advent of CNC it has become unusual to use non-computerized toolpath control for this purpose.

The turning processes are typically carried out on a lathe, considered to be the oldest of machine tools, and can be of different types such as straight turning, taper turning, profiling or external grooving.  Those types of turning processes can produce various shapes of materials such as straight, conical, curved, or grooved workpieces.
In general, turning uses simple single-point cutting tools. Each group of workpiece materials has an optimum set of tool angles that have been developed through the years.

The bits of waste metal from turning operations are known as chips (North America), or swarf (Britain).  In some areas they may be known as turnings.

The tool's axes of movement may be literally a straight line, or they may be along some set of curves or angles, but they are essentially linear (in the non mathematical sense).

A component that is subject to turning operations can be termed as a “Turned Part” or “Machined Component”. Turning operations are carried out on a lathe machine which can be manually or CNC operated.

Turning operations
Turning specific operations include:

 Turning

The general process of turning involves rotating a part while a single-point cutting tool is moved parallel to the axis of rotation. Turning can be done on the external surface of the part as well as the internal surface (the process known as boring). The starting material is generally a workpiece generated by other processes such as casting, forging, extrusion, or drawing.

 Tapered turning   Tapered turning produces a cylindrical shape that gradually decreases in diameter from one end to the other. This can be achieved a) from the compound slide b) from taper turning attachment c) using a hydraulic copy attachment d) using a C.N.C. lathe e) using a form tool f) by the offsetting of the tailstock - this method more suited for shallow tapers.

 Spherical generation  Spherical generation produces a spherical finished surface by turning a form around a fixed axis of revolution. Methods include a) using hydraulic copy attachment b) C.N.C. (computerised numerically controlled) lathe c) using a form tool (a rough and ready method) d) using bed jig (need drawing to explain).

   Hard turning is a type of turning done on materials with a Rockwell C hardness greater than 45. It is typically performed after the workpiece is heat treated.

The process is intended to replace or limit traditional grinding operations. Hard turning, when applied for purely stock removal purposes, competes favorably with rough grinding. However, when it is applied for finishing where form and dimension are critical, grinding is superior. Grinding produces higher dimensional accuracy of roundness and cylindricity. In addition, polished surface finishes of Rz=0.3-0.8z cannot be achieved with hard turning alone. Hard turning is appropriate for parts requiring a roundness accuracy of 0.5-12 micrometres, and/or surface roughness of Rz 0.8–7.0 micrometres. It is used for gears, injection pump components, and hydraulic components, among other applications.

  

Facing in the context of turning work involves moving the cutting tool at right angles to the axis of rotation of the rotating workpiece. This can be performed by the operation of the cross-slide, if one is fitted, as distinct from the longitudinal feed (turning). It is frequently the first operation performed in the production of the workpiece, and often the last—hence the phrase "ending up".

 Parting
This process, also called parting off or cutoff, is used to create deep grooves which will remove a completed or part-complete component from its parent stock.

 Grooving

Grooving is like parting, except that grooves are cut to a specific depth instead of severing a completed/part-complete component from the stock.  Grooving can be performed on internal and external surfaces, as well as on the face of the part (face grooving or trepanning).

Non-specific operations include:

 Boring  Enlarging or smoothing an existing hole created by drilling, moulding etc.i.e. the machining of internal cylindrical forms (generating) a) by mounting workpiece to the spindle via a chuck or faceplate b) by mounting workpiece onto the cross slide and placing cutting tool into the chuck. This work is suitable for castings that are too awkward to mount in the face plate. On long bed lathes large workpiece can be bolted to a fixture on the bed and a shaft passed between two lugs on the workpiece and these lugs can be bored out to size. A limited application but one that is available to the skilled turner/machinist.

Drilling  is used to remove material from the inside of a workpiece. This process utilizes standard drill bits held stationary in the tail stock or tool turret of the lathe. The process can be done by separately available drilling machines.

 Knurling The cutting of a serrated pattern onto the surface of a part to use as a hand grip or as a visual enhancement using a special purpose knurling tool.

 ReamingThe sizing operation that removes a small amount of metal from a hole already drilled. It is done for making internal holes of very accurate diameters. For example, a 6mm hole is made by drilling with 5.98 mm drill bit and then reamed to accurate dimensions.

Threading  Both standard and non-standard screw threads can be turned on a lathe using an appropriate cutting tool. (Usually having a 60, or 55° nose angle) Either externally, or within a bore (tapping operation is a process of making threads either inner or outer in an work piece. Generally referred to as single-point threading.

tapping of threaded nuts and holes a) using hand taps and tailstock centre b)using a tapping device with a slipping clutch to reduce risk of breakage of the tap.

threading operations include a)all types of external and internal thread forms using a single point tool also taper threads, double start threads, multi start threads, worms as used in worm wheel reduction boxes, leadscrew with single or multistart threads. b) by the use of threading boxes fitted with 4 form tools, up to 2" diameter threads but it is possible to find larger boxes than this.

Polygonal turning in which non-circular forms are machined without interrupting the rotation of the raw material.

Lathes

A lathe is a machine tool used principally for shaping pieces of metal, wood, or other materials by causing the workpiece to be held and rotated by the lathe while a tool bit is advanced into the work causing the cutting action. Lathes can be divided into three types for easy identification: engine lathe, turret lathe, and special purpose lathes. Some smaller ones are bench mounted and semi-portable. The larger lathes are floor mounted and may require special transportation if they must be moved.
Field and maintenance shops generally use a lathe that can be adapted to many operations and that is not too large to be moved from one work site to another. The engine lathe is ideally suited for this purpose. A trained operator can accomplish more machining jobs with the engine lathe than with any other machine tool. Turret lathes and special purpose lathes are usually used in production or job shops for mass production or specialized parts, while basic engine lathes are usually used for any type of lathe work.

Workholding methods 

Chuck: Chucks are a very common workholding method. There are many types, some for round and square stock, and other for irregular shapes.
Collet: Primarily used for small round workpieces.
Faceplate: A faceplate, drive dog, and mandrel may be used to turn D such as gear blanks.
Centers: Pointed cones between which the part spins, often driven by a 'dog'.  May be used to turn longer shafts and cylinders.
Drive center: Use hydraulic or spring-loaded teeth that "bite" into the end of workpieces and can be used when the entire length of the workpiece must be machined.

Tooling

The various angles, shapes, and sizes of a single-point cutting tool have direct relation to the resulting surface of a workpiece in machining operations. Different types of angle such as rake angle, side rake angle, cutting-edge angle, relief angle, nose radius exist and may be different with respect to the workpiece. Also, there are many shapes of single-point cutting tools, such as V-shaped and Square. Usually, a special toolholder is used to hold the cutting tool firmly during operation.

Dynamics of turning

Forces
The relative forces in a turning operation are important in the design of machine tools. The machine tool and its components must be able to withstand these forces without causing significant deflections, vibrations, or chatter during the operation. There are three principal forces during a turning process:

The cutting or tangential force acts downward on the tool tip allowing deflection of the workpiece upward. It supplies the energy required for the cutting operation. The specific cutting force required to cut the material is called specific cutting force. Cutting force depends on the material.
The axial or feed force acts in the longitudinal direction. It is also called the feed force because it is in the feed direction of the tool. This force tends to push the tool away from the chuck.
The radial or thrust  force acts in the radial direction and tends to push the tool away from the workpiece.

Speeds and feeds
Speeds and feeds for turning are chosen based on cutter material, workpiece material, setup rigidity, machine tool rigidity and spindle power, coolant choice, and other factors.

Feed
 The distance the tool advances into the material in one revolution is called "feed". It is specified as mm per revolution (mm/rev).

See also
Diamond turning
Engine turning
Hard turning
Surface feet per minute
Woodturning

References

External links

 
 Schneider, George. "Turning Tools and Operations." American Machinist, January, 2010.
 Lathe Turning Operations
 Subcontract Turning Company
 Turning Operation With CNC Program

 
Lathes